Eric Reverter Castellet (born 7 January 1992) is a Spanish professional footballer who plays for Sant Cugat EFC as a left winger.

Club career
Born in Sabadell, Barcelona, Catalonia, Reverter finished his formation with CE L'Hospitalet, but started appearing as a senior with neighbouring CE Sabadell FC's reserve team. On 21 October 2012 he made his professional debut with the latter, playing the last eight minutes in a 0–1 away loss against UD Las Palmas in the Segunda División championship.

On 22 July 2013, after only 86 minutes of action in the league, Reverter signed with UE Olot from Segunda División B, on loan.

References

External links
 
 
 
 

1992 births
Living people
Sportspeople from Sabadell
Spanish footballers
Footballers from Catalonia
Association football wingers
Segunda División players
Segunda División B players
Tercera División players
CE Sabadell FC B players
CE Sabadell FC footballers
UE Olot players
Atlético Levante UD players
CE Europa footballers